Nick Nolte: No Exit is a 2008 documentary about actor Nick Nolte.  The documentary was directed by Tom Thurman.

Participants
In addition to Nolte, the following people also appeared in the documentary:

Rosanna Arquette
Jacqueline Bisset
Powers Boothe
F. X. Feeney
James Gammon
Barbara Hershey
Paul Mazursky
Mike Medavoy
Alan Rudolph
Ben Stiller

Reception
Roger Ebert awarded the film two stars.

References

External links
 
 

American documentary films
2008 films
2008 documentary films
2000s English-language films
2000s American films
Documentary films about actors